Hill Airy is a historic plantation house located near Stovall, Granville County, North Carolina.  It was built about 1841, and is a -story, five bay, vernacular Greek Revival style frame dwelling.  It has a central hall plan and exterior double shouldered end chimneys. It also has a large garden on the grounds in the shape of a Maltese cross.

It was listed on the National Register of Historic Places in 1974.

References

Plantation houses in North Carolina
Houses on the National Register of Historic Places in North Carolina
Greek Revival houses in North Carolina
Houses completed in 1841
Houses in Granville County, North Carolina
National Register of Historic Places in Granville County, North Carolina